Elections to the European Parliament take place every five years by universal adult suffrage; with more than 400 million people eligible to vote, they are considered the second largest democratic elections in the world after India's.

Until 2019, 751 MEPs were elected to the European Parliament, which has been directly elected since 1979. Since the withdrawal of the United Kingdom from the EU in 2020, the number of MEPs, including the president, has been 705. No other EU institution is directly elected, with the Council of the European Union and the European Council being only indirectly legitimated through national elections. While European political parties have the right to campaign EU-wide for the European elections, campaigns still take place through national election campaigns, advertising national delegates from national parties.

Apportionment

The allocation of seats to each member state is based on the principle of degressive proportionality, so that, while the size of the population of each country is taken into account, smaller states elect more MEPs than is proportional to their populations. As the numbers of MEPs to be elected by each country have arisen from treaty negotiations, there is no precise formula for the apportionment of seats among member states. No change in this configuration can occur without the unanimous consent of all governments.

Voting system

There is no uniform voting system for the election of MEPs; rather, each member state is free to choose its own system, subject to certain restrictions:
 The system must be a form of proportional representation, under either the party list or the single transferable vote system.
 The electoral area may be subdivided if this will not generally affect the proportional nature of the electoral system.
 The electoral threshold, if there is any, may not exceed 5%. From the 2024 election there will be a minimum threshold of between 2% and 5% for constituencies with more than 35 seats.

Voting difference by country
Most of the member states of the European Union elect their MEPs with a single constituency covering the entire state, using party-list proportional representation. There is however a great variety of electoral procedures: some countries use a highest averages method of proportional representation, some use the largest remainder method, some open lists and others closed. In addition, the method of calculating the quota and the election threshold vary from country to country. Countries with multiple constituencies are:
 Belgium is split into 3 constituencies: the Dutch-speaking electoral college, the French-speaking electoral college, and the German-speaking electoral college. The first two of these elect their MEPs using party list PR, but the German-speaking constituency only has 1 member, who is therefore not elected by a proportional method.
 Republic of Ireland is split into three constituencies and uses the Single transferable vote.
 The United Kingdom, historically up until its exit from the Union, was split into constituencies representing Scotland, Wales, Northern Ireland and each of the regions of England. Northern Ireland used the single transferable vote while the other constituencies used party lists.

Germany, Italy and Poland use a different system, whereby parties are awarded seats based on their nationwide vote as in all of the states that elect members from a single constituency; these seats are given to the candidates on regional lists. With the number of seats for each party known, these are given to the candidates on the regional lists based on the number of votes from each region towards the party's nationwide total, awarded proportionally to the regions. These subdivisions are not strictly constituencies, as they do not decide how many seats each party is awarded, but are districts that the members represent once elected. The number of members for each region is decided dynamically after the election, and depends on voter turnout in each region. A region with high turnout will result in more votes for the parties there, which will result in a greater number of MEPs elected for that region.

Europarties

The European Union has a multi-party system involving a number of ideologically diverse Europarties. As no one Europarty has ever gained power alone, their affiliated parliamentary groups must work with each other to pass legislation. Since no pan-European government is formed as a result of the European elections, long-term coalitions have never occurred.

Europarties have the exclusive right to campaign for the European elections; their parliamentary groups are strictly forbidden to campaign and to spend funds on any campaign-related activity. Campaign activities differ per country since national elections for European Parliament representatives are governed by national laws. For instance, a European party can buy unlimited advertising airtime in Estonia while it is barred from any form of paid advertising in Sweden.

For the 2014 EP election, Europarties decided to put forward a candidate for President of the European Commission. Each candidate led the pan-European campaign of the Europarty. While no legal obligation exists to force the European Council to propose the candidate of the strongest party to the EP, it was assumed that the council would have no other choice than to accept the voters' decision. Therefore, following the victory of the European People's Party in the 2014 EP election, its lead candidate Jean-Claude Juncker was elected President of the European Commission.

The two major parties are the centre-right European People's Party and the centre-left Party of European Socialists. They form the two largest groups, (called EPP and PES respectively) along with other smaller parties. There are numerous other groups, including democratic socialists, greens, regionalists, conservatives, liberals and eurosceptics. Together they form the seven recognised groups in the parliament. MEPs that are not members of groups are known as non-inscrits.

Voter behaviour
A 1980 analysis by Karlheinz Reif and Hermann Schmitt concluded that European elections were fought on national issues and used by voters to punish their governments mid-term, making European Parliament elections de facto national elections of second rank. This phenomenon is also referred to by some experts as the "punishment traps," wherein voters use the European Parliament elections and other European integration referendums as punishment for governments on account of bad economic performance. There is also a study that showed how voters tend to choose candidates of a party at the European level if it has a history of advancing specific issues that they care about. This is related to the second theory that explains voter behavior and it involves the so-called attitude voting in which voters are assumed to be acting on the basis of their attitude towards the European integration. This is analogous to the American two-party system in the sense that voting on issues and legislation in the Parliament only requires a yes or no vote, which means voter vote for options or candidates that are close to their ideals.

Turnout had constantly fallen in every EU election from 1979 until 2014. The 2019 election, however, saw turnout increase to its highest level since 1994, at 51%. In 2009, the overall turnout was at 43%, down from 45.5% in 2004. In Britain the turnout was just 34.3%, down from 38% in 2004.
Despite falling below 50% between 1999 and 2014, turnout was not as low as that of the US Midterm elections, which usually falls below 40%. However, the comparison with the US voter turnout is hampered due to the fact that the US president is elected in separate and direct elections (presidential system), whereas the President of the European Commission is elected by the European Parliament (parliamentary system), giving the European Parliament elections considerable weight. Some, such as former President of the European Parliament, Pat Cox, have also noted that turnout in the 1999 election was higher than the previous US presidential election. German MEP Jo Leinen has suggested that EU parties name their top candidate for the position of President of the European Commission in order to increase turnout. This happened for the 2014 election, with EPP candidate Jean Claude Juncker ultimately selected, after the EPP won the most seats overall.

Results

Historical percentage results in union-wide elections of the three major groups by region.

Legend:    Socialist (PES/S&D) –  Liberal (ELDR/ALDE) –  People's (EPP/EPP-ED)

Results by member state

Off-year
1981: Greece

1987: Spain, Portugal

1995: Sweden

1996: Austria, Finland

2007: Bulgaria, Romania

2013: Croatia

By-elections in the United Kingdom

1979: London South West

1987: Midlands West

1988: Hampshire Central

1996: Merseyside West

1998: Yorkshire South, North East Scotland

Proposed reforms
The final report of the Conference on the Future of Europe includes more than 320 proposed measures to reform the European Union. It proposes amending EU electoral law to harmonise electoral conditions (voting age, election date, requirements for electoral districts, candidates, political parties and their financing) for the European Parliament elections, as well as moving towards voting for Union-wide lists, or 'transnational lists', with candidates from multiple member states. It also recommends facilitating digital voting possibilities and guaranteeing effective voting rights for persons with disabilities. The report states that European citizens should have a greater say on who is elected President of the European Commission, suggesting this could be achieved either by the direct election of the Commission President or by a lead candidate system.

Commission President

The third Delors Commission had a short mandate, to bring the terms of the Commission in line with that of the Parliament. Under the European Constitution the European Council would have to take into account the results of the latest European elections and, furthermore, the Parliament would ceremonially "elect", rather than simply approve, the council's proposed candidate. This was taken as the parliament's cue to have its parties run with candidates for the President of the European Commission with the candidate of the winning party being proposed by the council.

This was partly put into practice in 2004 when the European Council selected a candidate from the political party that won that year's election. However at that time only one party had run with a specific candidate: the European Green Party, who had the first true pan-European political party with a common campaign, put forward Daniel Cohn-Bendit. However the fractious nature of the other political parties led to no other candidates, the People's Party only mentioned four or five people they'd like to be president. The Constitution failed ratification but these amendments have been carried over to the Treaty of Lisbon, which came into force in 2009.

There are plans to strengthen the European political parties in order for them to propose candidates for the 2009 election. The European Liberal Democrat and Reform Party have already indicated, in their October 2007 congress, their intention for forward a candidate for the post as part of a common campaign. They failed to do so however the European People's Party did select Barroso as their candidate and, as the largest party, Barroso's term was renewed. The Socialists, disappointed at the 2009 election, agreed to put forward a candidate for Commission President at all subsequent elections. There is a campaign within that party to have open primaries for said candidate.

In February 2008, President Barroso admitted there was a problem in legitimacy and that, despite having the same legitimacy as Prime Ministers in theory, in practice it was not the case. The low turnout creates a problem for the President's legitimacy, with the lack of a "European political sphere", but analysis claim that if citizens were voting for a list of candidates for the post of president, turn out would be much higher than that seen in recent years.

With the Lisbon Treaty now in-force, Europarties are obliged from now-on to put forward a candidate for President of the European Commission; each Presidential candidate will, in fact, lead the pan-European campaign of the Europarty.

The President of the European Parliament Jerzy Buzek proposed in 2010 that Commissioners be directly elected, by member states placing their candidate at the top of their voting lists in European elections. That would give them individually, and the body as a whole, a democratic mandate.

Eligibility

Each Member State has different rules determining who can vote for and run as the European Parliamentary candidates. In Spain v United Kingdom, the European Court of Justice held that member states are permitted to extend the franchise to non-EU citizens.

Every EU citizen residing in an EU country of which he/she is not a national has the right to vote and to stand as a candidate in European Parliamentary elections in his/her country of residence, under the same conditions as nationals of that country – this right is enshrined in Article 39 of the Charter of Fundamental Rights of the European Union. In addition, the right to vote is included in Articles 20(1) and 22(1) of the Treaty on the Functioning of the European Union. To this extent all EU countries keep electoral registers containing the names of all eligible voters in the specific region, to which eligible newcomers to the area can apply at any time to have their names added. EU citizens are then eligible to vote for the duration of their stay in that country.

It is therefore possible for a person to have the choice of voting in more than one EU member state. For example, a Portuguese citizen who studies at university in France and lives at home outside term-time in the family home in the Netherlands has the option of voting in the European Parliamentary election in France, Portugal or the Netherlands. In this scenario, although the Portuguese citizen qualifies to vote in three EU member states, he/she is only permitted to cast one vote in one of the member states.

See also
 Democratic legitimacy of the European Union
 History of the European Union
 Appointment of the European Commission

References

External links
 EU-NED dataset: subnational election data in European Parliament elections, 1990-2020
 Section devoted to the 2009 election on the European Parliament website
 Adam Carr's Election Archive
 European Election Studies
 The European Parliament and Supranational Party System (Cambridge University Press 2002)
 Archive of European Integration (AEI) > Institutional Administration, Developments & Reform > Parliament > Elections
 EPP Juncker 2014 campaign site
 Election Results 2016

European Parliament elections
Politics of the European Union
Quinquennial events